The 1996 Big West Conference baseball tournament determined the conference champion for the Big West Conference at the end of the 1996 season. The teams met from May 10 through 12 at Cal State Fullerton's on campus stadium, Titan Field.

Seeding and format 
The top four teams at the end of the conference's round robin regular season were seeded one through four based on conference winning percentage, with head to head matchups used as a tiebreaker. UNLV claimed the season series over UC Santa Barbara, and therefore was seeded second.

Bracket 
The following bracket depicts the results of the tournament.

References 

Tournament
Big West Conference Baseball Championship